Sadala is a small borough in Jõgeva Parish, Jõgeva County, Estonia. It's located about 18 km northeast of the town of Jõgeva and 19 km west of Mustvee. In 2000 it had a population of 312.

References

External links
Jõgeva Parish 
Sadala Primary School 

Boroughs and small boroughs in Estonia